, nicknamed "Shibajun", is a Japanese pop female singer-songwriter. In 2016 she was diagnosed with partial hearing loss.

Musical characteristics 
Many of her songs are of slow and medium tempo and/or ballads expressive of fragility. Occasionally her soft vocals are accompanied by herself on the piano.

In her early stages of her singing career, she was known to have travelled extensively nationwide to perform live at local record stores in front of small crowds.

She has provided lyrics to the well-known Japanese singing-duo Chemistry for their song "Tsukiyo".

Discography 
Numbers in bold represent peak Oricon Weekly Ranking position.

Singles 
  June 27, 2001 (Indies Release) Uncharted
  October 31, 2001 Uncharted
  February 20, 2002 No. 90
  June 26, 2002 No. 34
  October 23, 2002 No. 20
  January 29, 2003 No. 17
  May 8, 2003 No. 43
  September 10, 2003 No. 8
  January 28, 2004 No. 20
  November 25, 2004 No. 22
  February 23, 2005 No. 31
  May 18, 2005 No. 30
  April 19, 2006 No. 8
  July 26, 2006 No. 22
 Hiromi January 11, 2007 No. 5
  September 12, 2007 No. 15
  May 28, 2008 No. 15
  September 17, 2008 No. 13
 Love Letter October 7, 2009 No. 14 6,061 copies sold

Studio albums 
  March 20, 2002 No. 59
  February 26, 2003 No. 12
  February 25, 2004 No. 15
  March 30, 2005 No. 6
  February 21, 2007 No. 9
  June 18, 2008 No. 9
  November 4, 2009 No. 9 17,380 copies sold
  August 3, 2011
  March 27, 2013
  December 17, 2014
  September 20, 2017
  October 31, 2018

Compilations 
 Single Collection September 21, 2005 No. 23
  March 14, 2007 No. 36
 All Time Request BEST ～しばづくし～ November 25, 2015

DVDs 
  March 26, 2003
 Live at Gloria Chapel June 23, 2004
  September 21, 2005
  September 26, 2007
  March 4, 2009

Digital releases 
  September 27, 2006

References

1976 births
Living people
Japanese women singer-songwriters
Japanese singer-songwriters
Musicians from Setagaya
Dreamusic artists
21st-century Japanese singers
21st-century Japanese women singers